The Root of All Evil is a 1947 British drama film, directed by Brock Williams for Gainsborough Pictures and starring Phyllis Calvert and Michael Rennie.  The film was the first directorial assignment for Williams, who was better known as a screenwriter, and also produced the screenplay based on the 1921 novel by J. S. Fletcher.

It was one of the less successful Gainsborough melodramas.

Plot
Jeckie Farnish (Calvert) has grown up in a grindingly poor household, and as she reaches adulthood falls in love with a local grocers son. She is loved by her childhood playmate Joe Bartle (John McCallum), but takes him for granted and feels that he lacks the spark or ambition to match her determination to make something of herself.  Instead she pursues Albert Grice (Hubert Gregg), son of a wealthy grocery store owner, and believes they have an understanding. She is horrified when Albert goes on holiday and returns newly married to another woman, heartbroken, she resolves to do whatever is necessary to claw her way out of poverty.

Seeing a possible payday as compensation for her disappointment, Jeckie sues Albert for breach of promise and emotional distress, and after she plays up her status as jilted victim to a local lawyer, she is awarded a considerable out of court settlement for damages.  Seeing the chance for revenge, she uses her windfall to set up her own grocery store, directly opposite that of the Grice emporium.  By undercutting on prices and offering customer perks, she soon succeeds in poaching nearly all of their business and starts to accumulate a tidy sum in profits.  Her ambition however stretches beyond a grocery store and its relatively modest financial potential.  She is intrigued to meet a handsome stranger Charles Mortimer (Rennie), who tells her that there are large deposits of oil on the edge of town and he is looking for a financial backer to help him exploit them.

Jeckie agrees to throw her lot in with Charles to get their hands on the land under which the oil can be drilled.  It belongs to an elderly man Scholes (Moore Marriott), who is of the opinion that it is a stony, barren and useless plot, and is happy to sell for what seems on the surface a generous price.  The oil operation quickly proves to have huge financial potential, and soon becomes a sizeable industry raking in vast profits.  Now a wealthy woman, Jeckie buys the grandest house in the area and lives a life of luxury.  She has fallen in love with Charles, but when she learns that he has misled her and is in fact married, she orders him to leave and says he will get no more share of the profits.

Meanwhile, Scholes' resentment at being swindled had been simmering in the background, and finally explodes when he decides to set fire to the refinery to exact his revenge.  The whole operation is destroyed in a spectacular blaze.  Faced with losing everything, Jeckie finally starts to analyse her own ruthlessness and avarice.  She realises that she has made many enemies and has few real friends.  But the faithful Joe has never criticised or judged her, and she finally sees that he was the man for her all along.

Cast
 Phyllis Calvert as Jeckie Farnish
 Michael Rennie as Charles Mortimer
 John McCallum as Joe Bartle
 Brefni O'Rorke as Farnish
 Moore Marriott as Scholes
 Hazel Court as Rushie Farnish
 Hubert Gregg as Albert Grice
 Arthur Young as George Grice
 Reginald Purdell as Perkins
 Stewart Rome as Sir George
 George Carney as Bowser
 George Merritt as Landlord
 Ellis Irving as Auctioneer

Production
J.S. Fletcher's novel was originally published in 1921.

It was the first English movie for Australian actor John McCallum. He tested for a small part but was given the second male lead instead. Hazel Court, Diana Drecker and Patricia Hicks also made early appearances.

The film was initiated by Maurice Ostrer who put McCallum under personal contract. During filming, Ostrer left Gainsborough.

Filming started in February 1946. The film was one of a number of expensive dramas financed by J. Arthur Rank with budgets over $1 million. Others included Hungry Hill, Daybreak, Odd Man Out, and Green for Danger.

Reception
The Irish Times called it "a slightly turgid film of the kind of book one reads only during a long convalescence."

References

External links 
 
 
 
Review of film at Variety
Complete original novel at Internet Archive
Novel serialised in Sydney Evening News in 1921–22 –  19 Nov, 21 Nov, 22 Nov, 23 Nov, 25 Nov, 26 Nov, 28 Nov, 29 Nov, 30 Nov, 1 Dec, 2 Dec, 3 Dec, 5 Dec, 6 Dec, 7 Dec, 8 Dec, 9 Dec, 10 Dec, 12 Dec, 14 Dec, 15 Dec, 16 Dec, 17 Dec, 19 Dec, 20 Dec, 21 Dec, 22 Dec, 23 Dec, 24 Dec, 27 Dec, 29 Dec, 30 Dec, 31 Dec, 2 Jan, 4 Jan, 5 Jan, 7 Jan, 9 Jan, 10 Jan, 11 Jan, 13 Jan, 14 Jan, 16 Jan, 17 Jan, 18 Jan

1947 films
1947 drama films
British black-and-white films
Films directed by Brock Williams
Gainsborough Pictures films
Films based on British novels
Melodrama films
British drama films
1947 directorial debut films
1940s English-language films
1940s British films